The Wasp Factory is the first novel by Scottish writer Iain Banks, published in 1984. Before the publication of The Wasp Factory, Banks had written several science fiction novels that had not been accepted for publication. Banks decided to try a more mainstream novel in the hopes that it would be more readily accepted, and wrote about a psychopathic teenager living on a remote Scottish island. According to Banks, this allowed him to treat the story as something resembling science fiction – the island could be envisaged as a planet, and Frank, the protagonist, almost as an alien. Following the  success of The Wasp Factory, Banks began to write full-time.

The Wasp Factory is written from a first person perspective, told by 16-year-old Francis Cauldhame ("Frank"), describing his childhood and all that remains of it. Frank observes many shamanistic rituals of his own invention, and it is soon revealed that Frank killed three children before he reached the age of ten himself.

The book sold well, but was greeted with a mixture of acclaim and criticism, due to its gruesome depiction of violence. The Irish Times called it "a work of unparalleled depravity."

Plot
The story is told from the perspective of 16-year-old Frank Cauldhame. Frank lives with his father on a small island in rural Scotland, and he has not seen his mother in many years. There is no official record of his birth, meaning his existence is largely unknown.

Frank occupies his time with rituals, building dams, and maintaining an array of weapons (a small catapult, pipe bombs, and a crude flamethrower) for killing small animals around the island. He takes long walks to patrol the island and occasionally gets drunk with his only friend, a dwarf. Otherwise, Frank has almost no contact with the outside world. He's haunted by the memory of a dog attack during his youth, which resulted in the loss of his genitalia. He resents others for his impotence, particularly women. This is in part due to the mauling coinciding with the last time he saw his mother, who had come back to give birth to his younger brother, leaving immediately after.

Frank's older brother, Eric, escapes from a psychiatric institution, having been arrested some years prior for arson and terrorizing the local children by force-feeding them live maggots. Eric often calls him from a pay-phone to inform Frank of his progress back to the island. Eric is extremely erratic; their conversations end badly, with Eric exploding in fits of rage. However, it's clear Frank loves his brother.

The Wasp Factory is a mechanism invented by Frank, consisting of a huge clock face, salvaged from the local dump, encased in a glass box. Behind each of the 12 numerals is a trap that leads to a different ritual death (such as burning, crushing, or drowning in Frank's urine) for the wasp that Frank puts into it via the hole at the centre. Frank believes the death "chosen" by the wasp predicts something about the future. The Factory is in the house's loft, which Frank's father cannot access because of a leg injury. There are also “Sacrifice Poles” constructed by Frank. The corpses of animals, such as mice that he has killed, are placed onto the poles for the purpose of attracting birds which will fly away and alert Frank of anybody approaching the island.

It's revealed that when Frank was much younger, he killed three of his relatives: two cousins and his younger brother. He also exhumed the skull of the dog that castrated him, and uses it as part of his rituals. Eric is described as having been extremely sensitive before the incident that drove him mad: a tragic case of neglect at the hospital where Eric was a volunteer when studying to become a doctor. While attempting to feed a brain-damaged newborn with acalvaria, Eric notes how the child is unresponsive and smiling, despite usually appearing expressionless. The child's skull is held together by a metal plate over his head. Eric checks underneath the plate to find the child's exposed brain tissue infested and being consumed by day-old maggots.

Frank's father is distant and spends most of his time in his study, which he keeps locked at all times. Frank longs to know what is inside. He is used to being lied to by his father, who seemingly does it purely for his own amusement. At the end of the novel, Frank is alerted of Eric's return when he sees a dog that has been burned alive and discovers Eric's campsite. This knowledge incites Frank's father to get drunk before forgetting to conceal the keys to his study, where Frank discovers male hormone drugs, tampons, and what appears to be the remains of his own genitals in a jar. He assumes that his findings mean that his father is actually female.
During the ensuing confrontation, Eric attempts to destroy the island with explosives and fire but is not successful.

Frank's father explains that it was Frank who was born a female; the hormones had been fed to him by his father since the dog attack in an experiment to see whether Frank would transition from female to male. The remains of his genitals were fake and it is suggested that his father's reasoning for doing this was to distance himself from the women he felt had ruined his life. In the end, Frank finds Eric, half asleep. He sits with him and considers his life up to this point and whether he should leave the island.

Literary significance and criticism
The book was initially greeted with a mixture of acclaim and criticism, due to its gruesome depiction of violence. While this is mostly against animals, Frank also recollects killing three younger children. The murders are described in an honest and matter-of-fact way, often with grotesque humour. The Irish Times called it "a work of unparalleled depravity." Banks' response to this criticism is that readers understood the humour of these scenes in a way that many critics did not in their reviews.

Neil Gaiman reviewed The Wasp Factory for Imagine magazine, and stated that "will delight horror fans with its mixture of black humour and horrible, imaginative, beautiful deaths."

A 1997 poll of over 25,000 readers of The Independent listed The Wasp Factory as one of the top 100 books of the 20th century.

Adaptations 
In 1992 Malcolm Sutherland adapted the novel for the stage. The production was performed at the Glasgow Citizen's Theatre. It was revived in 1997 and shown in Yorkshire and London.

In 1997 Craig Warner adapted the novel into a 10 part serial (15 minute episodes) for BBC Radio 4.

In 2008 the Sutherland production went on tour again.

In 2013, the Australian producer and composer Ben Frost directed an opera adaptation of the Iain Banks novel, in which all characters are represented by three female singers.

Release details
 1984, UK, Macmillan, Pub date 16 February 1984, hardback (First edition)

References

External links
 Iain Banks discusses The Wasp Factory on the BBC World Book Club
 Iain Banks discusses The Wasp Factory at the Guardian Book Club
 Iain Banks writing about the creation of The Wasp Factory for the Guardian

1984 British novels
1984 debut novels
1980s LGBT novels
British LGBT novels
Fiction about animal cruelty
LGBT speculative fiction novels
Obscenity controversies in literature
Macmillan Publishers books
Metaphysical fiction novels
Novels about serial killers
Novels by Iain Banks
Novels set in Scotland
Novels set on islands
Novels with transgender themes
Psychological novels
Scottish bildungsromans
Scottish novels